Saeed Beigi (born November 1, 1979, in Iran) is a retired Iranian football defender.

References

External links
 Saeed Beigi at soccerwaye

Iranian footballers
1979 births
Living people
Esteghlal F.C. players
Saba players
Saipa F.C. players
Esteghlal Ahvaz players
Shahrdari Arak F.C. players
Association football defenders